Exit 67 is a 2010 French-Canadian (Quebec) film written and directed by Jephté Bastien.

The film was shot in French, English and Creole language and is set around Montreal's street gangs. In an interview with Montreal's La Presse columnist Rima Elkouri, director Jephté Bastien states that the death of his 16 years old nephew inspired him to make the film.

The film had its world premiere at the 2010 edition of Montreal's Fantasia Festival. It was named the winner of the Claude Jutra Award for the best feature film by a first-time film director, at the 31st Genie Awards.

Synopsis
The following description, was written by Simon Laperrière, a Director and Programmer at the festival, and translated by Rupert Bottenberg, a Montreal-based journalist, was featured in the festival's program catalogue:

"A life of crime seems inevitable for Jecko. A mixed-race Québécois with a Haitian background, he witnessed his mother's death at his father's hands when he was eight years old, an event that scarred him for life. Tossed from one foster family to another, Jecko finally finds the sense of belonging he's lacked when he starts hanging out with the young hoodlums of the St-Michel neighbourhood. They invite him to join their gang, promising him money and power, everything he's dreamed of but that he knows polite society will never offer him.

For a teenager with few hopes for the future, one highly susceptible to influence, it's not an offer to refuse. Even if it means bending to the will of a violent and domineering gang leader. Even if his initiation is to kill a stranger. Several years later, crime and violence have brought Jecko to the pinnacle of an underworld empire. In this world where riches and respect are earned with a gun, he feels perfectly at home.

A number of events have him reconsidering the path before him. With the option of pulling one final crime, his father due out of prison shortly and hopes of building his own family, it's time for Jecko to grab the steering wheel of his destiny. But leaving St-Michel won't be so easy.

Cast

See also 
 List of hood films

References

External links 
 
 
 Sortie 67 at Fantasia Festival.com

2010 films
Canadian action drama films
2010 action drama films
Films set in Montreal
Quebec films
Best First Feature Genie and Canadian Screen Award-winning films
Hood films
2010s gang films
2010 directorial debut films
French-language Canadian films
2010s American films
2010s Canadian films